Chakeiya Camille Richmond (born 28 July 1992), known professionally as Keiyaa (stylized as KeiyaA), is an American singer-songwriter, multi-instrumentalist, and a record producer. She independently released her debut album Forever, Ya Girl in 2020.

Early life and education 
Chakeiya Camille Richmond was born and raised in Chicago on the city's south side. During childhood she sang in the Chicago Children's Choir until switching to the alto saxophone in seventh grade. She cited soul artists including Chaka Khan, Patrice Rushen, jazz musicians like John Coltrane and Miles Davis and R&B groups such as SWV as early musical influences. She also finds inspiration in goth and post-punk/alternative rock artists like Nirvana and Siouxsie and the Banshees.

Richmond attended University of Illinois at Chicago and Columbia College to study jazz and play alto sax before leaving due to disillusionment with the program's hierarchical nature, as well difficulty balancing school with working full-time. Shortly after she decided to pursue music professionally.

Career 
While still playing and performing on alto sax, she collaborated with Chicago musicians including Noname and Vic Mensa. She decided to switch her focus to solo work producing and singing R&B and electronic music. Performing under the name Keiya, she released her debut EP, WORK, in July 2015. It was described as "emotional, sleepy, and yet strikingly optimistic" by These Days magazine. Shortly after its release she moved to New York. She added an additional "A" to her name (KeiyaA) in order to differentiate herself from other performers on streaming sites.

KeiyaA's debut album Forever, Ya Girl was released in March 2020 and self-produced under her personal label Forever Recordings. It was reviewed by Olivia Ovendon for KEXP as featuring "powerful mantra-esque lyrics, and woozy, heady, immersive beats in captivating fashion." Esquire described the sound as "downcast grime and smooth R&B." Pitchfork writer Clare Lobenfeld rated the album an 8.2/10 and praised its "resolute realness that can only happen outside the major label gaze." Forever, Ya Girl was named to Pitchfork, Rolling Stone, and The Guardian's "Best Albums of 2020" lists.

She performed an NPR Tiny Desk concert at her home on February 11, 2021.

Personal life 
Keiyaa resides in Brooklyn.

References

External links 
Keiyaa on Instagram
Keiyaa on Discogs

1992 births
Living people
African-American women singer-songwriters
21st-century American women singers
American rhythm and blues singers
American electronic musicians
American jazz saxophonists
21st-century African-American women singers
American record producers
Singers from Chicago
21st-century American singers
Singer-songwriters from Illinois